Diane was a 38-gun frigate of the French Navy, launched in 1796. She participated in the battle of the Nile, but in August 1800 the Royal Navy captured her. She was taken into British service as HMS Niobe, and broken up in 1816.

French career

During the battle Rear-Admiral Denis Decrès was on board Diane in his capacity as commander of the frigate squadron. He would go on to become Napoleon's Minister of Marine.

In 1800, as she tried to escape from Malta, and HMS Genereux captured her. At the time she had only 114 men on board, having left the remainder at Malta to assist in its defense.

British career

On 28 March 1806, Niobe was off Groix when she captured the 16-gun , which had just separated from Leduc's division.

On 13 November 1810, off Le Havre along with Diana, Niobe sighted the 40-gun  and the 44-gun .  and  joined the chase, attacking the French squadron when it was anchored at Saint-Vaast-la-Hougue at the action of 15 November 1810. Eventually, Elisa was wrecked near La Hougue, while Amazone escaped to Le Havre. Four months later at the action of 24 March 1811, Niobe participated in the destruction of the French frigate Amazone near the Phare de Gatteville lighthouse, Normandy.

Amazones crew scuttled her to prevent her capture.

Fate
HMS Niobe was eventually sold on 31 July 1816.

Citations

Sources 
 Naval Database
 
 
 
 

1796 ships
Frigates of the French Navy
War of 1812 ships of the United Kingdom
Frigates of the Royal Navy
Captured ships